Vladan Vukosavljević (born October 6, 1984) is a Serbian professional basketball player for the Timișoara of the Romanian Liga Națională. He was born in Jagodina, but he moved to Svilajnac as a boy.

References

External links
 Vladan Vukosavljević at tblstat.net
 Vladan Vukosavljević at beobasket.net
 Vladan Vukosavljević at abaliga.com

1984 births
Living people
ABA League players
Aliağa Petkim basketball players
BC Oostende players
BC Politekhnika-Halychyna players
Centers (basketball)
KK Crvena zvezda players
KK Hemofarm players
KK Lovćen players
KK Radnički Kragujevac (2009–2014) players
OKK Beograd players
Sportspeople from Jagodina
Serbian expatriate basketball people in Belgium
Serbian expatriate basketball people in Lebanon
Serbian expatriate basketball people in Montenegro
Serbian expatriate basketball people in Romania
Serbian expatriate basketball people in Turkey
Serbian expatriate basketball people in Ukraine
Serbian men's basketball players